There were several ships of the Polish Navy bearing the name of ORP Ślązak:
 , an A56-class torpedo boat serving with the Polish Navy between 1921 and 1937, a former German A-59
 , a  serving during the World War II
 , an M-XV-class (build 96) submarine built in the Soviet Union and commissioned in 1955. 
  is a former , currently under construction as patrol vessel, expected to be completed in 2016.

Polish Navy ship names